Kamil Kuczyński (born 23 March 1985) is a Polish cyclist. He was born in Płock. He competed at the 2008 Summer Olympics in Beijing, and at the 2012 Summer Olympics in London.

References

1985 births
Living people
Sportspeople from Płock
Polish male cyclists
Cyclists at the 2008 Summer Olympics
Cyclists at the 2012 Summer Olympics
Olympic cyclists of Poland
Polish track cyclists
Sportspeople from Masovian Voivodeship
21st-century Polish people